Caroline-Stéphanie-Félicité, Madame de Genlis (25 January 174631 December 1830) was a French writer of the late 18th and early 19th century, known for her novels and theories of children's education. She is now best remembered for her journals and the historical perspective they provide on her life and times.

Life

Caroline-Stéphanie-Félicité du Crest de Saint-Aubin was born on 25 April 1746 at Champcéry near Autun, in the Saône-et-Loire region. Her parents were Pierre César du Crest (1711-1763), later Marquis de Saint Aubin, and Marie Françoise Félicité Mauget de Mézières (1717-1790).

Her father's debts forced them to sell their home in 1757 and move to Paris. She and her mother spent interludes at the estates of Charles Guillaume Le Normant d'Étiolles and Alexandre Le Riche de La Poupelinière, where she studied dancing from a ballet master of the Comédie-Française, singing by Ferdinando Pellegrini, and learned to play the harp. Later in Paris they survived on Stéphanie-Félicité's skills as a harpist. Pierre César was captured by the English returning from Santo Domingo in 1760, a fellow prisoner being Charles-Alexis Brûlart (1737-1793), Comte de Genlis, whom he introduced to his daughter after their release. After Pierre died in 1763, they married at midnight on November 8, 1763; as a younger son, his title 'Comte' was complimentary and she was always known as Madame de Genlis.

In 1782 she published her first epistolary novel Adèle et Thèodore written while on holiday in Lusignano in Liguria, where the basic theme is that of education, where she takes a clear distance from  Emile , for her the condition of women depends on the education that is imparted to take the role that belongs to her in society, while for Jean-Jacques Rousseau the sphere of female action is restricted to the domestic sphere and therefore their education remains limited; for Genlis, education represents a step forward for her emancipation but on the other hand she is submitted first to the will of her mother and then of her husband. The success of this novel is due to the fact that she is the first woman to be gouverneur of princes of royal blood.

Since Charles-Alexis' own parents were dead, they went to live with his godfather, the Marquis de Puisieux and had three children; Caroline (1765-1786), Pulchérie (1767-1847) and Casimir (1768-1773). It is possible that she also had one or more secret offspring; as Talleyrand later wrote: "In spite of the strictness which she preached and the morality which she professed in her writing, one always meets in her later novels something of the easiness of her earlier morals; one always finds in them love affairs and illegitimate children."

She died in Paris on 31 December 1830 and was buried in Père Lachaise Cemetery.

Career

Her relative, Madame de Montesson (1738-1806), was also known for her beauty and intelligence, later becoming a playwright. She married the duc d'Orléans in 1773, although barred from using the title 'Duchess of Orléans.' With her support, Stéphanie-Félicité became lady-in-waiting to Louise Marie Adélaïde de Bourbon, wife of the Duke's son Philippe d'Orléans, Duke of Chartres, and with her husband joined the Duke's entourage in the Palais-Royal in early 1772, drawing a stipend of 10,000 livres.

She began an affair with Chartres almost immediately, their love letters being published in 1904 by Gaston Maugras as L’idylle d’un gouverneur. As Talleyrand noted, "The Duc de Chartres found her charming, told her this, and was quickly listened to, for Madame de Genlis, to avoid the scandal of coquetry, always yielded easily." Although their affair was short-lived, in 1777 he appointed her governess to his daughters, who were joined by two 'adopted' English girls, Stephanie Caroline Anne Syms or "Pamela" and Hermine Syms. This was in line with her theory of educating her pupils with children of different nationalities to better learn foreign languages; the household already contained English and Italian servants. Although it has often been suggested Pamela was the product of her relationship with Chartres, this has been challenged by recent scholarship. In 1781, Chartres took the then unusual step of putting her in charge of his sons' education, which led to the resignation of their existing tutors; she and Charles-Alexis formally separated the following year. 

For her husband's amusement, Madame de Montesson set up their own theatre, for which she and Madame de Genlis wrote plays, the parts being taken by their children. Audiences numbered as many as 500 aristocrats and writers, including Diderot and D'Alembert. This developed her approach to education, later set out in Théâtre d'éducation (4 vols., 1779–1780), a collection of short comedies for young people, Les Annales de la vertu (2 vols., 1781) and Adèle et Théodore (3 vols., 1782). Charles Augustin Sainte-Beuve claims she anticipated many modern methods of teaching; history was taught using magic lantern slides and her pupils learnt botany from a botanist during their walks.

In 1785, Chartres succeeded as duc d'Orléans; her brother Charles-Louis Ducrest became his secretary. When the French Revolution began in 1789, both he and Charles-Alexis joined the Girondins faction and were executed in 1793 with many of their political colleagues. Stéphanie-Félicité and her pupil Mademoiselle d'Orléans took refuge in Switzerland, before moving to Berlin in 1794. Considered too liberal by Frederick William II, she was forced to live in Hamburg but returned when his son succeeded him in 1797. 

After Napoleon came to power in 1799, she returned to France. Her aunt was a close friend of Napoleon's wife Joséphine de Beauharnais and this connection resulted in her being given rooms at the Arsenal and a small pension. Her best known romance Mademoiselle de Clermont was published in 1802, along with a number of other novels. Her government pension was discontinued after the 1814 Bourbon Restoration; her former pupil Louis Philippe gave her a small pension but she relied on the income from her writing.

Her later years were occupied with literary quarrels, notably those arising from her 1822 publication Diners du Baron d'Holbach, which attacked what she viewed as 'the intolerance, fanaticism, and eccentricities of the philosophes of the 18th century.' She survived long enough to see her former pupil, Louis Philippe, become king in 1830. The vast majority of her works are now little read but provide interesting historical background, especially Mémoires inédits sur le XVIII' siècle, published in 1825.

Legacy

In Britain, she was best known for her children's works, which many welcomed as they presented many of Rousseau's methods, while attacking his principles. They also avoided libertinism and Roman Catholicism, concepts often associated with the French by the British, who appreciated her innovative educational methods, particularly her morality plays. According to Magdi Wahba, another reason for her popularity was the belief she was as moral as the Baronne d'Almane in Adèle et Théodore. They discovered this was not the case when she fled to London in 1791 but while she lost the esteem of some, including Frances Burney, it had little effect on her book sales.

Jane Austen was familiar with her works, although she returned the novel 'Alphonsine' to the Lending Library, claiming it "did not do. We were disgusted in twenty pages, as, independent of a bad translation, it has indelicacies which disgrace a pen hitherto so pure". However, in Emma her heroine suggests her governess would raise her own daughter the better for having practised upon her, "like La Baronne d'Almane on La Countesse d'Ostalis in Madame de Genlis' Adelaide and Theodore". Modern critics claim other themes addressed by Genlis appear in both Emma and Northanger Abbey. Austen continued to read (and lend out) her works however, complaining in 1816 for example that she couldn't "read Olimpe et Theophile without being in a rage. It is really too bad! – Not allowing them to be happy together when they are married." Austen's nieces Anna and Caroline also drew inspiration for their own writings from Madame de Genlis.

British women writers of the late eighteenth century were particularly inspired by Genlis's novel of education Adèle et Théodore, which Anna Letitia Barbauld compared to Rousseau's Emile as a type of "preceptive fiction."  Anna Barbauld admired Genlis's "system of education, the whole of which is given in action" with "infinite ingenuity in the various illustrative incidents." Clara Reeve described Genlis's educational program as "the most perfect of any" in Plans of Education (1794), an epistolary work loosely based on Genlis's novel. Adelaide O'Keeffe's Dudley(1819) was modeled directly after Genlis's work, and other texts such as Anna Letitia Barbauld and John Aikin's Evenings at Home were inspired by Genlis's Tales of the Castle, a "spin-off" of Adèle et Théodore. As Donelle Ruwe notes, Genlis's emphasis on the mother as a powerful educating heroine was inspirational, but so too were her books' demonstrations of how to create homemade literacy objects such as flash cards and other teaching aids.

In literature
Félicité de Genlis appears as a character in the works of Honoré de Balzac (Illusions perdues) and Victor Hugo (Les Misérables), among others. She is also mentioned in War and Peace by Leo Tolstoy, Our Village by Mary Russell Mitford, Oblomov by Ivan Goncharov, humourist story M-me Genlis's spirit by Nikolai Leskov,  The Angel in the House by Coventry Patmore, The Rector of Justin by Louis Auchincloss, Nausea by Jean-Paul Sartre, Emma by Jane Austen, and A Place of Greater Safety by Hilary Mantel.

Selected works
Madame de Genlis was a prodigious author. As Saint-Beuve observed in one of his Causeries de Lundi, "if the inkstand had not existed, she would have invented it."

Genlis, Stéphanie Félicité du Crest de Saint Aubin, Madame de GENLIS (1746-1830) Correspondance en grande partie inédite adressée par Madame de Genlis à M. Anatole de Montesquiou (1788-1878), officier d'ordonnance de l'Empereur et aide de camp. L'ensemble des lettres, au nombre de 520 environ, couvre la période 1810 à 1830, mais surtout les années 1825 et 1826. L'année 1826 représente une correspondance presque journalière comme novembre et décembre 1825. Cette correspondance est parfois très intime, Madame de Genlis appelle d'ailleurs M. de Montesquiou : "Mon cher Anatole", elle est aussi très en relation avec les idées et les choses du temps. Elle parle beaucoup de magnétisme, de religion, d'éducation bien sûr mais aussi de personnages tels que Voltaire, Talma ou Madame Récamier. Chaque lettre est généralement signée et comporte une à deux pages in-4 avec adresse. On trouve dans l'année 1820 un petit manuscrit de 30 pages intitulé "Cantique des fleurs" fait pour Pulchérie, sa fille(1830). La correspondance d’Anatole de Montesquiou à Madame de Genlis est , elle, conservée aux Archives Nationales.
[Genlis], Théâtre à l'usage des jeunes personnes, ou Théâtre de l'éducation, I, Paris: Lambert et Baudoin, 1779; II, III, IV, Paris, 1780; 2v, Paris, 1781 Paris? 1782; Suisse: Libraires associés, 1781, 2v; Paris, 1826, Paris, 1829, 5v; London, 1781; 3v, London, 1783; London, 1787
Genlis, Theatre of Education, tr., 3v, London: T. Cadell, 1783
[Genlis], Théâtre de Société, Paris/Suisse: Libraires associés, 1780; 2v, 1781; 1782
Genlis, Les Annales de la vertu, ou Cours d'histoire à l'usage des jeunes personnes, I, Paris: Lambert et Baudoin, 1781, 2v, Paris, 1782
[Genlis], Adèle et Théodore, Paris: Lambert et Baudouin, 1782, 3v; 1804
[Genlis], Adèle et Théodore, ou, Lettres sur l'éducation; Contenant tous les principes relatifs aux trois différents plans d'Education, des Princes, des jeunes Personnes, & des Hommes, Maestricht: Dufour et Roux, Imprimeurs-Libraires associés, 1782, 3v
Genlis, Adèle and Théodore, London: Cadell, 1788
Genlis, Adèle et Théodore, Paris: Crapelet, 1801, 2nd ed.
Genlis, Essais sur l'education des hommes, et particulièrement des princes par les femmes, pour servir de supplément aux Lettres sur l'Education, Paris, 1782
Genlis?, Deux réputations, attaque contre les philosophes, Paris?, 1784
Genlis, Le club des dames, ou le retour de Descartes, comédie en un acte en prose, Paris, 1784
Genlis, Les Veillées du château, ou Cours de morale à l'usage des enfants, 2v, Paris: Lambert, 1784
Genlis, Tales of the Castle, London, 1785 (Princeton PQ 1985 G5xV413 1785)
Genlis, Tales of the Castle, tr., Thomas Holcroft, 4th ed., 5v, London: Robinson, 1793 (NYPL *ZAN) "The Solitary Family of Normandy [Forges]; The Two Reputations; Daphnis and Panrose; The Palace of Truth"
Genlis, Contes moraux, Paris: Libraires associés, 1785 (@ Gallica)
Genlis, Sacred dramas, London, 1786 (from Old Testament)
Genlis, Pièces tirées de l'Ecriture Sainte par Mme de G., Genève, 1787 (from Old Testament)
Genlis, La religion considérée comme l'unique base du bonheur et de la véritable philosophie, Paris: Imprimerie polytype, 1787; Paris, 1787; Paris, 1790
Genlis, The child of nature (play), London, 1788
Genlis, Discours sur l'éducation de Monsieur le Dauphin, Paris: Onfroy, 1790
Genlis, Discours sur l'éducation publique du peuple, Paris, 1791
Genlis, Discours sur le luxe et l'hospitalité, Paris, 1791
Genlis, Discours sur la suppression des couvens de religieuses et l'éducation publique des femmes, Paris, 1791
Genlis, Leçons d'une gouvernante à ses élèves, ou Fragmens d'un journal qui a été fait pour l'éducation des enfans de Monsieur d'Orléans, Paris: Onfroy, 1791, 2v
Genlis, Lessons of a Governess, London: Robinson, 1792 (Princeton LB 575 G4 A6)
Genlis, Les chevaliers du cygne, ou la cour de Charlemagne, 3v, Hamburg: Fauche, 1795; Paris, 1818
Genlis, The castle of truth, a moral tale, Philadelphia, 1795
Genlis, Précis de la conduite de Madame de Genlis depuis la Révolution..., Hamburg: Hoffmann, 1796 *ZAN-T3340 Reel 36 No. 239
Genlis, Epître à l'asile que j'aurai, suivie de deux fables, du chant d'une jeune sauvage, de l'épître à Henriette Sercey et des réflexions d'un ami des talens et des arts, par Mme de Genlis, Hambourg, 1796
Genlis, The Knights of the Swan, tr., Beresford, 2v, Dublin: Wogan etc., 1797
Genlis, Discours moraux et politiques sur divers sujets, et particulièrement sur l'éducation, 1797
Genlis, Tales from the castle, London, 1798; Brattleborough, 1813
Genlis, Les petits émigrés, ou Correspondance de quelques enfans: ouvrage fait pour servir à l'éducation de la jeunesse, Paris & Hamburg, 1798; 7e ed., Paris: Lecointe et Durey, 1825, 2v (@ Gallica)
Genlis, Réflexions d'un ami des talens et des arts, Paris, an VII, 1798
Genlis, Manuel du voyageur, ou recueil de dialogues, de lettres, etc., 2v, Berlin, 1798, 1799; in English, Paris, 1810
Genlis, Manuel du voyageur ou Recueil de dialogues, de lettres, etc. ; suivi d'un Itinéraire raisonné à l'usage des françois en Allemagne et des allemands en France / par Madame de Genlis ; avec la trad. allemande par S. H. Catel.  http://gallica.bnf.fr/scripts/ConsultationTout.exe?E=3D0&O=3DN102658
Genlis, Les Voeux téméraires ou l'enthousiasme, 2v, Hambourg: Pierre Chateauneuf, 1798, 1799
Genlis, Herbier moral ou receuil des fables nouvelles et autres pièces fugitives, 2v, Hambourg: Pierre Chateauneuf, 1799; Paris, 1800
Genlis, Le petit La Bruyère, Hambourg: Fauche, 1799; Paris: Maradan, 1801
Genlis, Les Mères rivales, ou la calomnie, 3v, Berlin: T. de la Garde, 1800; Paris, 1801; Paris: Maradan, 1819
Genlis, La Bruyère the Less: or, Characters and manners of the children of the present age, Dublin, 1801
Genlis, Nouvelle méthode d'enseignement pour la première jeunesse, Paris: Maradan, 1801
Genlis, Nouvelles heures à l'usage des enfants, Paris: Maradan, 1801
Genlis, Projet d'une école rurale pour l'éducation des filles, Paris, 1801
Genlis, Contes, Bibliothèque des romans, Paris: Maradan, 1801
Genlis, Mademoiselle de Clermont, Nouvelle historique, Paris: Maradan, An 10-1802; Paris, 1827, 1844, 1880, 1892
Genlis, Mademoiselle de Clermont, Nouvelle historique, ed., Béatrice Didier, Paris: Regine Deforges, 1977
Genlis, Nouveaux Contes moraux et Nouvelles historiques, 3v, Paris: Maradan, 1802; 1815–19
Genlis, La Philosophie chrétienne, ou extraits tirés des ouvrages de Mme de Genlis terminés par plusieurs chapitres nouveaux (par Demonceaux), Paris, 1802
Genlis, Nouvelles, Mercure, XIV, 1803
Genlis, L'Epouse impertinente par air, suivie du Mari corrupteur et de La femme philosophe, Paris: Maradan, 1804
Genlis, Les souvenirs de Félicie L., Paris: Maradan, 1804; Firmin-Didot, 1882
Genlis, La duchesse de la Vallière, 2v, Paris: Maradan, 1804; 10e ed., 2v, Paris: Maradan, 1818; Paris, 1889, 1983
Genlis, Réflexions sur la miséricorde de Dieu par Mme de la Vallière suivies de quelques lettres de la même..., Paris: Maradan, 1804
Genlis, Nouvelles, Paris, 1804
Genlis, Leçons, ou traité élémentaire de dessein..., Leipzig: J.C. Hinrichs, 1805 (Princeton)
Genlis, Les Monuments religieux, ou description critique et détaillée des monuments religieux, tableaux, statues, qui se trouvent actuellement en Europe..., Paris: Maradan, 1805
Genlis, Etude du coeur humain, d'après Barbier, Paris: Maradan, An XIII 1805
Genlis, Le Comte de Corke ou la séduction sans artifice, suivie de six nouvelles, 2v, Paris: Maradan, 1805, 1819
Genlis, Le duc de Lauzun, Paris, repr., London: H. Colburn, 1805 (Princeton)
Genlis, L'Etude du coeur humain, suivi des cinq premières semaines d'un journal écrit sur les Pyrénées, Paris, 1805
Genlis, Madame de Maintenon, pour servir de suite à l'histoire de Mlle de La Vallière, Paris: Maradan, 1806
Genlis, Alphonsine, ou La tendresse maternelle, Paris: Maradan, 1806
Genlis, Esprit de Mme de Genlis (par Demonceaux), Paris, 1806
Genlis, Suite des souvenirs de Félicie (etc.), Paris: Maradan, 1807
Genlis, Le siège de La Rochelle ou le Malheur de la conscience, Paris: Nicolle, 1807; : Maradan, 1818 (as opera, with Inchbald, Drury Lane, 1835
Genlis, Bélisaire, Paris: Maradan, 1808; London, 1808; Baltimore, 1810
Genlis, Sainclair, ou la victime des sciences et des arts, Paris: Maradan, 1808; London: Colburn, 1808; NY, 1813
Genlis, The Affecting History of the Duchess of C, (from Adèle et Théodore, v2) NY: Borradaile, 1823; Poughkeepsie, 1809; NY: Duyckinck, 1814
Genlis, Alphonse, ou Le fils naturel, Paris: Maradan, 1809
Genlis, Arabesques mythologiques, ou Les attributs de toutes les divinités de la fable, 2v, Paris: Barrois, 1810
Genlis, La botanique historique et littéraire, Paris: Maradan, 1810
Genlis, La Maison rustique pour servir à l'éducation de la jeunesse: ou, Retour en France d'une famille émigrée, 3v, Paris, 1810
Genlis, The traveller's companion; containing dialogues and models of letters... In six languages... , Paris: Barrois, 1810
Genlis, De l'influence des femmes sur la littérature française comme protectrices des Lettres ou comme auteurs: Précis de l'histoire des femmes françaises les plus célèbres, Paris: Maradan, 1811
Genlis, Observations critiques pour servir à l'histoire de la littérature française du XIXe siècle ou Réponse de Mme de Genlis à Messieurs T. et M. et sur les critiques de son dernier ouvrage..., Paris: Maradan, 1811
Genlis, Examen critique de l'ouvrage intitulé: Biographie universelle, Paris: Maradan, 1811
Genlis, Suite de l'examen critique de l'ouvrage intitulé: Biographie universelle, Paris: Maradan, 1812
Genlis, Les bergères de Madian, ou La jeunesse de Moïse, Poème en prose, Paris: Galignani, 1812; Maradan, 1821
Genlis, Mademoiselle de Lafayette ou le siècle de Louis XIII, 2v, Paris: Maradan, 1813
Genlis, La Feuille des gens du Monde ou le Journal imaginaire, Paris: Eymery, 1813
Genlis, Sainclair, or the victim to the arts and sciences, NY, 1813
Genlis, Les hermites du Marais Pontins, Paris: Maradan, 1814
Genlis, Histoire de Henri le Grand, 2v, Paris: Maradan, 1815
Genlis, Les dimanches, ou journal de la jeunesse, Paris, 1dec1815-15fev1817
Genlis, Jeanne de France: Nouvelle historique, 2v, Paris: Maradan, 1816
Genlis, Le journal de la jeunesse, Paris, 1816
Genlis, La religion considérée comme l'unique base du bonheur et de la véritable philosophie, nouvelle (4e) ed., augmentée de quelques notes, Paris: Maradan, 1816
Genlis, Les Bat(t)uécas, 2v, Paris: Maradan, 1816
Genlis, Les tableaux de M. le comte de Forbin, ou la mort de Pline l'Ancien et Inès de Castro, Paris: Maradan, 1817 (Ines de Castro, Paris, 1826, 1985 )
Genlis, Inès de Castro, Toulouse: Ombres, coll. "Petite bibliotheque Ombres", 1995, 160 p
Genlis, Zuma, ou la découverte du quinquina, Paris: Maradan, 1817
Genlis, Abrégé des Mémoires du marquis de Dangeau, Paris, 1817, 4v
Genlis, Dictionnaire critique et raisonné des étiquettes de la cour, des usages du monde, des amusements, des modes, des moeurs, etc... depuis la mort de Louis XIII jusqu'à nos jours, Paris: Mongie, 1818
Genlis, Les voyages poétiques d'Eugène et d'Antonine, Paris: Maradan, 1818
Genlis, Almanach de la jeunesse en vers et en prose, Paris: Giroux, 1819
Genlis, Alphonsine, ou La tendresse maternelle, Paris: Maradan, 1819
Genlis, Les parvenus ou les aventures de Julien Delmours, 3v, Paris: C. Baecker, 1819; Lecointe et Durey, 1824
Genlis, Pétrarque et Laure, 2v, Paris: Ladvocat, 1819; 3e ed., Paris: 1825
Genlis, ed., Rousseau, Emile, 3v, Paris: Maradan, 1820, 3v
Genlis, Petrarch and Laura, London, 1820, 2v in one
Genlis, Petrarch and Laura, translated from the French, Sir Richard Phillips & Co 1820. 
Genlis, Catéchisme critique et moral de l'abbé Flévier de Reval (Feller), 2v, Paris, 1820
Genlis, L'Intrépide, nos 1-9, Paris, 1820
Genlis, ed., Voltaire, Le Siècle de Louis XIV, 3v, Paris?, 1820
Genlis, Palmyre et Flaminie, ou, Le Secret, 2e ed., 2v, Paris: Maradan, 1821
Genlis, Prières ou Manuel de piété proposé à tous les fidèles et particulièrement aux maisons d'Education, Paris: Maradan, 1821
Genlis, Six nouvelles morales et religieuses, Paris: Janet, nd (1821)
Genlis, Isaac, comédie en deux actes, Paris, 1821
Genlis, Les jeux champêtres des Enfants: Contes de fées, Paris: Marc, nd (1821)
Genlis, Les dîners du baron d'Holbach, Paris: Trouvé, 1822
Genlis, Les veillées de la chaumière, Paris: Lecointe, 1823
Genlis, Mémoires de la marquise de Bonchamps sur la Vendée, Paris, 1823
Genlis, Les Prisonniers, contenant six nouvelles..., Paris: Bertrand, 1824
Genlis, De l'emploi du temps, Paris: Bertrand, 1824
Genlis, Les Athées conséquents ou Mémoires du commandeur de Linanges, Paris: Trouvé, 1824
Genlis, "Notice sur Carmontel" in Proverbes et comédies posthumes de Carmontel, Paris: Ladvocat, 1825
Genlis, Mémoires inédits, 10v, Paris: Ladvocat, 1825-28  *ZAN-T3340 Reel 130-31 No. 853
Genlis, Théresina ou l'Enfant de la Providence, Paris: Ladvocat, 1826
Genlis, Le La Bruyère des domestiques, 2v, Paris: Thiercelin, 1828
Genlis, Le dernier voyage de Nelgis ou Mémoires d'un vieillard, Paris: Roux, 1828
Genlis, Eugène and Lolotte, a tale for children, Boston, 1828
Genlis, Etrennes politiques pour 1828. Lettre au duc d'Orléans, Paris, 1828
Genlis, Les Soupers de la Maréchale de Luxembourg, 2e ed., Paris: Roux, 1828, 3v
Genlis, Manuel de la jeune femme: Guide complet de la maîtresse de maison, Paris: Béchet, 1829
Genlis, Athénaïs, ou le chateau de Coppet en 1807, Paris, 1832
Genlis, Lettres de Madame de Genlis à son fils adoptif, in Minerva, Paris, 1903
Genlis, Madame de Genlis et la Grande-Duchesse Elisa, Paris: Paul, 1912
Genlis, Mémoires, Paris: Barba, 18??
Genlis, Mémoires de Madame de Genlis (en un volume), Paris: Firmin-Didot, 1878
Genlis, The Unpublished correspondence of Mme de Genlis and Margaret Chinnery and related documents in the Chinnery family papers, Oxford: Voltaire Foundation, SVEC 2003:02), ed., Denise Yim.

References

Sources

Bibliography
{{cite book |author=Dobson, Austin |title="Madame de Genlis" in Four Frenchwomen |url=https://archive.org/details/fourfrenchwomen00dobsgoog |place=New York|pages=107–207|publisher=Dodd, Mead, & Co |year=1895 }}
Wyndham, Violet. Madame de Genlis: A Biography. NY: Roy Publishers, 1958
Laborde, A.M. L'Oeuvre de Madame de Genlis. Paris: Nizet, 1966
Grosperrin, Bernard. "Un manuel d'éducation noble: Adèle et Théodore de Mme de Genlis," Cahiers d'Histoire XIX (1974), pp. 343–352 |year=1974
Broglie, Gabriel de. Madame de Genlis. Paris: Librairie académique Perrin, 1985
Brown, Penny. "‘La femme enseignante’: Madame de Genlis and the moral and didactic tale in France," Bulletin of the John Rylands University Library of Manchester, 76:3(Autumn, 1994), p. 23-42.
Douthwaite, Julia. The Wild Girl, Natural Man, and the Monster: Dangerous Experiments in the	Age of Enlightenment. Chicago: University of Chicago Press, 2002. 
Dow, Gillian. "Stéphanie-Félicité de Genlis and the French Historical Novel in Romantic Britain." Women’s Writing 19.3 (2012): 273-92. https://dx.doi.org/10.1080/09699082.2012.666414

Plagnol, Marie-Emmanuelle. "Le théâtre de Mme de Genlis. Une morale chrétienne sécularisée." Dix-huitième siècle, 24(1992): 367-382.
Robb, Bonnie Arden. Félicité de Genlis: Motherhood in the Margins. University of Delaware Press, 1995
Robb, Bonnie Arden. "Madame de Maintenon and the Literary Personality of Madame de Genlis: Creating Fictional, Historical, and Narrative Virtue," Eighteenth-Century Fiction, 7:4(July, 1995), p. 351-372. 
Ruwe, Donelle. "The British Reception of Genlis’s Adèle et Théodore, Preceptive Fiction and the Professionalization of Handmade Literacies." Writing Women (2017), p. 1-16. https://dx.doi.org/10.1080/09699082.2017.1323385
Schaneman, Judith Clark.  "Rewriting Adèle et Théodore: Intertextual Connections Between Madame de Genlis and Ann Radcliffe."  Comparative Literature Studies 38.1 (2001): 31-45. 
Plagnol-Diéval, Marie-Emmanuelle. Madame de Genlis, Bibliographie des écrivains français, v6, Paris/Rome: Memini |year=1996.
Yim, Denise. "Madame de Genlis's Adèle et Théodore: Its Influence on an English Family's Education." Australian Journal of French Studies'' 38 (2001): 141-57.

External links
 
 

1746 births
1830 deaths
18th-century French women writers
Burials at Père Lachaise Cemetery
French salon-holders
French classical harpists
French ladies-in-waiting
French memoirists
French women novelists
Governesses to the Children of France
People from Saône-et-Loire
People of the French Revolution
French women memoirists
French women children's writers
French children's writers
18th-century French educators
19th-century French women writers
Mistresses of Louis Philippe II, Duke of Orléans
18th-century memoirists
18th-century French writers
19th-century French writers